= LINC00900 =

Non-coding RNA in the species Homo sapiens

Identifiers
- Aliases: LINC00900, long intergenic non-protein coding RNA 900
- External IDs: GeneCards: LINC00900
Orthologs
Databases	NCBI: entry; OMA: entry
Species	Human	Mouse
Entrez	283143	n/a
Ensembl	ENSG00000246100	n/a
UniProt	n a	n/a
RefSeq (mRNA)	n/a	n/a
RefSeq (protein)	n/a	n/a
Location (UCSC)	n/a	n/a
PubMed search		n/a
- Wikidata
View/Edit Human

Long intergenic non-protein coding RNA 900 is a Non-coding RNA that in humans is encoded by the LINC00900 gene.
